Songbook is the eighth studio album by Kenny Garrett, released in 1997 by Warner Bros. Records. It received a Grammy Award nomination for Best Jazz Instrumental Performance. It features Garrett in a quartet consisting of pianist Kenny Kirkland and drummer Jeff “Tain” Watts (both known as part of Branford Marsalis’s quartet), and bassist Nat Reeves.

Track listing

Personnel 
Musicians
 Kenny Garrett – alto saxophone
 Kenny Kirkland – piano
 Nat Reeves – bass
 Jeff "Tain" Watts – drums

Production
 Robin Burgess – management, co-producer
 Joe Ferla – engineer
 Greg Calbi – engineer (mastering)
 John Reigart – assistant engineer (recording)
 Tom Schick – assistant engineer (recording)
 Ed Raso – assistant engineer (mixing)
 Stephen Walker – art direction
 Lenn Irish – photography

References 

Warner Records albums
Kenny Garrett albums
1997 albums